The 2014–15 Men's FIH Hockey World League Semifinals took place in June and July 2015. A total of 20 teams competing in 2 events took part in this round of the tournament playing for 7 berths in the Final, played between 5–13 December 2015 in Raipur, India.

This round also served as a qualifier for the 2016 Summer Olympics as the 6 highest placed teams apart from the host nation and the five continental champions qualify.

Qualification
11 teams ranked between 1st and 11th in the FIH World Rankings current at the time of seeking entries for the competition qualified automatically, in addition to 9 teams qualified from Round 2. The following twenty teams, shown with final pre-tournament rankings, competed in this round of the tournament.

Buenos Aires

All times are Argentina Time (UTC−03:00)

Umpires
Below are the 11 umpires appointed by the International Hockey Federation:

Bruce Bale (GBR)
Murray Grime (AUS)
Kim Hong-lae (KOR)
Gabriel Labate (ARG)
Lim Hong Zhen (SIN)
Jakub Mejzlik (CZE)
Deon Nel (RSA)
Haider Rasool (PAK)
Maximiliano Scala (ARG)
Simon Taylor (NZL)
Daniel López Ramos (URU)

First round

Pool A

Pool B

Second round

Quarterfinals

Ninth and tenth place

Fifth to eighth place classification

Crossover

Seventh and eighth place

Fifth and sixth place

First to fourth place classification

Semifinals

Third and fourth place

Final

Awards

Antwerp

All times are Central European Summer Time (UTC+02:00)

Umpires
Below are the 10 umpires appointed by the International Hockey Federation:

Diego Barbas (ARG)
Eduardo Lizana (ESP)
Gareth Greenfield (NZL)
Nathan Stagno (GBR)
Eric Kim Lai Koh (MAS)
Raghu Prasad (IND)
Tim Pullman (AUS)
Roel Van Eert (NED)
Geoffroy van Elegem (BEL)
John Wright (RSA)

First round

Pool A

Pool B

Second round

Quarterfinals

Ninth and tenth place

Fifth to eighth place classification

Crossover

Seventh and eighth place

Fifth and sixth place

First to fourth place classification

Semifinals

Third and fourth place

Final

Awards

Final rankings
Qualification for 2016 Summer Olympics

 Continental champions
 Qualified through 2014–15 FIH Hockey World League

Goalscorers

References

External links
Official website (Buenos Aires)
Official website (Antwerp)

Semifinals
International field hockey competitions hosted by Belgium
International field hockey competitions hosted by Argentina
FIH Hockey World League Semifinals
Field hockey at the Summer Olympics – Men's qualification tournaments
International sports competitions in Buenos Aires